Galleria Umberto is a cash only North End of Boston pizzeria that specializes in Sicilian-style pizza and was named an America’s Classic by the James Beard Foundation in 2018. They are open only for lunch and when they sell out, they close for the day.

History
Umberto Deuterio founded Galleria Umberto in 1974 and passed it down to his sons Paul and Ralph.

The building was originally a church. The New Brick Church, which was torn down in the 1840s and known locally as the Cockerel Church because of the shame of its rooftop weathervane. The spire of the church that replaced it was destroyed by a hurricane about 40 years later. The original rooster weathervane was designed by Shem Drowne

References

North End, Boston
Pizzerias in the United States
Restaurants in Boston
James Beard Foundation Award winners
1974 establishments in Massachusetts